Vassil Tzankov Tzankov (Bulgarian: Васил Цанков Цанков) (April 2, 1905, Gorna Oryahovitsa, Bulgaria – August 25, 1986, Sofia, Bulgaria) was a Bulgarian geologist and paleontologist. He is best known for his work on Upper Cretaceous ammonites and bivalves.<ref>{{cite book |author1= Tzankov, V.|author2=Pamouktchiev, A. |author3= Tchechmedjieva, V. |author4=Motekova, N. |year=1981 |title= Les fossiles de Bulgarie V Crétacé supérieur. Grandes foraminifères, Anthozoaires, Gastéropodes, Bivalvia |publisher= Éditions de L'Académie bulgare des sciences |place= Sofia}}</ref> Tzankov was head of Bulgarian Geological Survey from 1941 until 1944. In 1945 he became docent and in 1947 - professor, and was appointed to the paleontology chair at Sofia University "St. Kliment Ohridski". In the late 1950s Tzankov organized the launch and became the first editor and one of the principal authors of the multi-volume treatise "Fossils of Bulgaria" (Bulgarian: Фосилите на България).  Contributors to the treatise included leading Bulgarian specialists in the field. He served as deputy director of the Geological Institute at the Committee for Geology and Mineral Resources in the period 1960-1966.  From 1967 to 1982 Tzankov also served as head of the Department of Paleontology with the Geological Institute at the Bulgarian Academy of Sciences.  In 1967 he was elected as a corresponding member of the Bulgarian Academy of Sciences.

 Early life 
Tzankov was raised in Shumen in the family of a veterinary physician, Dr. Tzanko Tzankov (1869-1941). After attending high school in Shumen, he enrolled in Sofia University, taking his undergraduate degree in natural history in 1929. He took his PhD in 1929, under the supervision of Dr. Stephan Bonchev and became the first student to be awarded a doctorate in natural science  in Bulgaria. His dissertation was regional paleontological survey of Shumen plateau, and in particular, stratigraphy and paleontology of the Upper Cretaceous fossils in Northeastern Bulgaria.

 Early career 
Tzankov commenced work as an assistant professor in geology at Sofia University in 1930.  He did postgraduate research in Vienna (1936), Paris (1938–39) and Berlin (1941).  In 1939, he was appointed chief of the Geology section at the Ministry of Trade, Industry and Labour.  In 1941,  he was appointed head of Geology Research within the newly established directorate “Natural Resources”.  During that period he introduced micropaleontological research – foraminifera,  conodonts, spores and pollen – in Bulgaria.  In 1945 he resumed his academic work at Sofia University.   In 1947, he was promoted to full professor. He would alternate in his role of director of the Bulgarian Geological Survey for many years, performing double duty as professor for those years.

 Fossils of Bulgaria 

Beginning in the  1950s, Tzankov drafted a project in which Bulgarian specialists would write on their area of expertise in paleontology as contributions to a multi volume series, which would be published by the Bulgarian Academy of Sciences. Tzankov became  editor, and also provided assistance for definition of morphologic terms, as well as other explanations. He supplied the parts to the treatise which concerned his own specialty areas.

 Later career 

In 1967, Tzankov was elected corresponding member of the Bulgarian Academy of Sciences.    In the same year he was also appointed as head of the Department of Paleontology at the Geological Institute of the Bulgarian Academy of Sciences, a position he held until 1982.

 Memberships 

 Corresponding Member of the Bulgarian Academy of Sciences.
 Honorary Member of the Bulgarian Geological Society.
 Editor – Geologica Balcanica

 Legacy and awards 

In his later years, Tzankov  continued his work on  "Fossils of Bulgaria" and on phylogeny of the ammonites Holcodiscidae and Asteridiscidae (together with St. Breskovski). He died in Sofia in 1986.  Vassil Tzankov was survived by his wife Kincha, daughter Yana and son Tzanko. He received  many awards, including an honorary badge  of Sofia University, state order Sts. Cyril and Methodius etc.  His collection of fossils is preserved in the Sofia University Museum of Paleontology and Historical Geology (SUMPHG).

 Selected bibliography 

He is author of more than 100 publications, including 5 textbooks and 3 books.

 Les Fossiles de Bulgarie'', Sofia: Éditions de L’Académie Bulgare des Sciences. Publié sous la rédaction de V. Tzankov

References

External links 

 

 

1905 births
1986 deaths
Academic staff of Sofia University
Bulgarian paleontologists
Corresponding Members of the Bulgarian Academy of Sciences
Sofia University alumni
20th-century Bulgarian zoologists